Anhembi is a Brazilian municipality in the state of São Paulo.  It can also refer to:

 Anhembi Convention Center or Anhembi Parque, a convention center located in the Santana district of São Paulo
 Anhembi Morumbi University, a Brazilian private university located in São Paulo
 Anhembi orthobunyavirus, also known as Anhembi virus, a species of virus
 Anhembi Sambadrome, a large outdoor event venue in São Paulo
 , a species of fish

See also
 Anhemitonic scale, a musical scale that does not contain semitones